Vita Bergen (lit. The White Mountains) is a park area of Södermalm in Stockholm. The former civil defence center Pionen, now used to host a data center is located there.

Vita Bergen is also mentioned in the novel The Red Room by August Strindberg as the place where Ygberg, one of the characters, lives.

References

Parks in Stockholm